Anil Bordia was an Indian educationist, social activist and former civil servant, widely respected for his contributions to the Indian education sector. The Government of India honoured him, in 2010, with Padma Bhushan, the third highest civilian award, for his services to the fields of education and literature on education.

Biography

Anil Bordia was born on 5 May 1934 in the Indian city of Indore, in Madhya Pradesh. He had his schooling at Bharataiya Vidya Bhavan in Udaipur and graduated from the M. B. College, Udaipur. He secured his post graduate degree from the St. Stephen's College, and, later, passed the Indian Administrative Service examination in 1957.

Anil Bordia was married to Otima, a former IAS officer, and the couple had a daughter, Maitreyi and a son, Shreyas. Bordia died on 2 September 2012, following a cardiac arrest, at the age of 78.

Civil services career
Anil Bordia joined Indian Administrative Service in 1957 for a civil services career which spanned 35 years, until retired from the service, as the Union Education Secretary in 1992. During his civil service, he was involved in many major educational projects and policy formulation assignments such as the Education Policy of 1986. During his public service, he launched the Bihar education project from 1977 through 1980, where he assembled many voluntary organisations, academic institutions and public resource centres to work towards achieving total literacy in the state. He was also behind the Mahila Samakhya project, a women's education project which has participation from various women's movements. In 1987, he launched the Shikha Karmi program for eradicating illiteracy from the state of Rajasthan. Under the program, society monitored schools with locally trained teachers were introduced which was reported to be successful in the universalisation of primary education in the state.

Social activism
After his retirement from the government service in 1992, Anil Bordia embarked on an education program for the young illiterates, which he conceptualised and named, Lok Jumbish, in Rajasthan. He guided the program until 1999 and was stated to be a highly successful initiative. In 2001, Bordia launched another movement, Doosra Dashak, which was aimed at the education and development of the youth.

He also headed a committee, Right To Education (RTE) committee, which submitted a detailed report with suggestions to synchronise the norms and strategies of the RTE with that of the Sarva Shiksha Abhiyan, a government program mandated to 
achieve Universalization of Elementary Education (UEE), so that operational synergies are achieved. He was also vocal about women's role in the society and girls' participation in primary education.

Legacy
Anil Bordia is remembered for his contributions in rejuvenating the education sector of the country and played a part in its policy formations, especially the National Education Policy of 1986. He was an active participant in the universalisation of education in Rajasthan and Bihar. He worked for the empowerment of marginalised communities and women which he tried to achieve through society participation and community resources. He is acknowledged as an expert in micro planning and positive decision making.

Controversy
Anil Bordia's name featured in an administrative litigation, when J. C. Jetli, a senior IAS officer, approached the Central Administrative Tribunal, against Bordia's appointment as a Government Secretary, superseding Jetli's claims. The case precipitated a CAT judgment asking the Central Government to lay down norms and guidelines for the appointment of cabinet secretaries.

He also had to meet with opposition during the Lok Jumbish program, when the rural people wanted full-fledged schools, rather than the system Bordia suggested, which finally led to the untimely cessation of the program in the state of Rajasthan.

Awards and recognitions
Anil Bordia was awarded Padma Bhushan, in 2010, along with his teacher at the St. Stephen's College, Professor Mohammed Amin, which was celebrated by the college as a felicitation to the awardees.
 Padma Bhushan – 2010
 UNESCO Avicenna Gold Medal – 2000
 UNESCO Fellow – Asia-Pacific Centre of Educational Innovation for Development, Bangkok

The National University of Educational Planning and Administration (NUEPA) organises an annual seminar on education and social empowerment, Anil Bordia Memorial Policy Seminar, in honour of the deceased educationist.

Writings

References

External links
 
 
 
 JP Naik Memorial Lecture highlights - 
 Shiksha Karmi (Education Worker) and Lok Jumbish (People's Movement) Initiatives - 

1934 births
2012 deaths
Recipients of the Padma Bhushan in literature & education
Indian civil servants
Social workers
Scientists from Indore
20th-century Indian educational theorists
Educators from Madhya Pradesh